Tina Zajc (born 1983 in Ljubljana) won the Slovenia national beauty contest, Miss Slovenia 2003, in 2003 and attended the Miss World 2003 competition. At the time, she was a 19-year-old geology student, studying earthquakes and volcanos. She also had a modelling and acting career, and had recorded a song. As the winner of Miss Slovenia 2003, she won a Peugeot 206 car, a ring, a set of Samsonite suitcases, and an all-expense trip to the Miss World competition held in China in December 2003. She liked crime novels, horror films and comedy, and spoke English and German, and Croat.

References

1983 births
Living people
Miss World 2003 delegates
Slovenian female models
People from Ljubljana
Slovenian beauty pageant winners
University of Ljubljana alumni